Yun Yeong-ryeol(윤영렬, 1854 – 1939) was a Korean Joseon Dynasty politician and soldier. nickname was Gyungjae, Yeongu. uncle of Yun Chi-ho and grandfather of Yun Bo-seon, father of Yun Chi-young.

Life 
Yun was born in 1854 as a member of Haepyung Yun clan. He passed the military examination of Gwageo in 1878. When the Donghak Peasant Revolution started, Yun was deployed in Jeolla Province. He participated in suppressing the revolution.

On 30 May 1897, Yun was appointed as keeper of Ansung. He started his military career as being appointed as First lieutenant on 21 January 1898. Yun was assessed as a good keeper who helped people by preventing crimes. On 26 February 1904, Yun was promoted to Captain and was appointed as Keeper of Nampo. On 4 April 1904, Yun became Yangho Jippogwan. As Yangho Jippogwan, Yun was ordered to arrest the criminals in Jeolla Province. On 13 April 1905, Yun became Major, and on 5 December 1905, Yun became Lieutenant Colonel. He got a prize from government for his merit in May 1906. On 20 July 1906, Yun became a colonel. By the request of Minister of Military, Yi Geun-taek, Yun was awarded for his merits again in 1906. Yun was promoted to Major General on 2 September 1906. In 1907, Yun was removed from service since he did not have any placement. After Japan–Korea Treaty of 1910 was signed, Yun came back to his home. He did not work as an official. He refused a title from the Japanese Government. On 2 September 1910, Yun with his older brother, Yun Ung-nyeol, they burned all the documents about slave trades from their family. He died on 4 November 1939 in Asan, his hometown.

References

Further reading 

 Kranewitter, Rudolf. (2005). Dynamik der Religion Schamanismus, Konfuzianismus, Buddhismus und Christentum in der Geschichte Koreas von der steinzeitlichen Besiedlung des Landes bis zum Ende des 20. Jahrhunderts. Münster: LIT Verlag. ; 
 Leibo, Steven A. (2006). East and Southeast Asia. Harpers Ferry, West Virginia: Stryker-Post Publications. 
 Speer, Robert E. (1905). "Korea, Japan and Russia," in The Ideal Home Educator: a Superb Library of Useful Knowledge. Chicago: Bible House. 
 Wells, Kenneth M. (1991). New God, New nation: Protestants and Self-Reconstruction Nationalism in Korea, 1896–1937. Honolulu: University of Hawaii Press. ;

External links 
 Haepyung Yun clean 
 Yun Chi-oh, his son
 Yun Chi-soh, his son

1854 births
1939 deaths
Korean politicians
19th-century Korean people
Yun Chi-ho
Kazoku
Major generals of Korean Empire
Imperial Korean military personnel
Converts to Christianity